Cambot is one of the fictional robot characters on the Mystery Science Theater 3000 television series. It is through Cambot's "eye" that viewers watch Joel Robinson (later Mike Nelson and subsequently Jonah Heston) and the other robots as they watch the movies that are sent to the Satellite of Love each week.

Appearance 
Cambot is only seen during the "Robot Roll Call" portion of the opening credits, often with his name reversed, presumably to imply he is shooting his own image in a mirror. His appearance was changed with almost every reshooting of the opening credits.

In the original KTMA season, Cambot was depicted as a robot operating a separate camera. Season 1 Cambot was a modification of the KTMA Gypsy, with an integrated camera, whereas later Cambot incarnations more closely resembled television recording equipment. In episode #507, I Accuse My Parents, Gypsy presented a drawing that depicted the Satellite of Loves crew as her "ideal family"; in the drawing, Cambot's torso was shown as a long and snakelike tube, not unlike Gypsy's.

Midway through the fifth season of the series the opening was once again reshot, and Cambot was again redesigned, this time with a more compact shape, becoming a round hovering ball with a TV camera vidicon sensor for an eye. He would keep this form for the remainder of the series, although the color scheme was changed during MST3K's switch from Comedy Central to the Sci Fi Channel (becoming blue instead of gray).

With the relaunch of the series with Season 11, Cambot underwent another drastic redesign, now appearing much more like a giant lens now with mock studio lighting camera reflectors. He appears to be attached to the ceiling by some kind of long mount.

Overview 

Cambot acts as an audio-visual conduit between the crew of the Satellite of Love and their observers. He also joins Joel, Mike, Crow T. Robot, and Tom Servo in the theatre when a movie is shown, and records the cast watching the film. Although a number of episodes depict the cast reacting as if traumatized by a particularly bad movie, Cambot suffered a severe reaction only once, weeping when several security cameras were systematically destroyed by the hero in episode #620: Danger!! Death Ray. (This was signified by a watery effect over the screen image.) Another rare case of Cambot interacting during a movie segment came in episode #202: The Sidehackers, when Cambot added a mock ESPN scorecard on one side of the screen during the movie's race scenes.

Cambot also frequently provides music, video clips, and other enhancements to host segments. When Joel or another character requests to see through "Rocket Number Nine" (the ship-mounted camera that allows the crew to see the ship's exterior and anything in its vicinity), it is Cambot who provides the image. During the first seven seasons, when Joel or Mike would read fan mail sent to the show, they would request Cambot to put the letter on "still store," freeze framing on a close-up of the letter.

Cambot was voiced a single time during the original KTMA run by Kevin Murphy.

At the end of Season 7, Cambot was shown joining his fellow crew-members ascending into pure energy at the end of the universe. When the Satellite of Love crashed on Earth in the show's final episode, it is not specified whether Cambot survived the crash (although one could assume that he is the one filming the final scene). Cambot was not mentioned in Mystery Science Theater 3000: The Movie. Cambot is revealed to have survived the crash in the Netflix revival of the series.

External links 
 A page with instructions for building a Cambot (As seen in seasons 5-7)
 Forum for the discussion of building prop replicas of Cambot

Mystery Science Theater 3000 characters
Fictional robots
Fictional broadcasters
Male characters in television
Television characters introduced in 1988
Television characters introduced in 1989